A plumber is a tradesperson who specialises in installing and maintaining systems used for potable (drinking) water, sewage, drainage, or industrial process plant piping.

Plumber may also refer to:

 The Plumber (1933 film), a 1933 animated short featuring Oswald the Lucky Rabbit
 The Plumber (1979 film), a 1979 Australian film
 Plumber (program), a mechanism for interprocess communication in the Plan 9 from Bell Labs operating system
 White House Plumbers, a White House Special Investigations Unit
 A nickname for Jean-Luc Dehaene, Belgian prime minister 1992–1999
 A video game for the Vii and VG Pocket Caplet

See also

 Plumbing
 Plumb (disambiguation)
 
 Plummer (disambiguation)
 Plumer (disambiguation)
 Plum (disambiguation)